Águila Solitaria (born August 31, 1954) is a Mexican Luchador enmascarado, or masked professional wrestler. Águila Solitaria's real name is not a matter of public record, as is often the case with masked wrestlers in Mexico where their private lives are kept a secret from the wrestling fans. His ring name, Águila Solitario, is Spanish for "Lone Eagle", which is reflected in the eagle wing design on his mask. Águila Soltaria made his professional wrestling debut in 1978 and since 1997 has only wrestled a limited schedule.

Professional wrestling career 
Águila Solitaria made his debut in 1978 after training under Hércules Flores and Tom Mix, adopting the winged black and silver mask that became his trademark in the following years. After working on the independent circuit for a couple of years he began working for Empresa Mexicana de Lucha Libre (EMLL) in 1980. While working for EMLL Águila Solitaria began bringing a live Eagle with him to the ring, having it perch on his arm until he stepped inside the ring and then often letting it fly free around the arena, sometimes with the result that the eagle would not return voluntarily. In 1981 Solitaria began making a name for himself by winning a string of Luchas de Apuestas (bet matches), winning the masks of at least six wrestlers in 1981 and at least two in 1982. On July 19, 1987 Águila Solitaria won his first singles championship when he defeated El Simbolo to win the Mexican National Welterweight Championship. Over the next 412 days Águila Solitaria defended the title several times, against wrestlers such as Bestia Salvaje. On September 3, 1988 Solitario lost the title to Bestia Salvaje. After losing the Mexican National title Águila Solitaria began chasing the NWA World Welterweight Championship, held by Fuerza Guerrera at the time. On June 2, 1989 Solitaria defeated Fuerza Guerrera to win the NWA World Welterweight Championship. Solitaria held the title for 111 days before Fuerza Guerrera regained the title on September 21, 1989. Following his NWA title loss Águila Solitaria began teaming with Ciclón Ramirez and Pantera to form a group known as Las Saetas del Ring (Spanish for "The Arrows of the Ring") Together Las Saetas won the Nuevo León State Trios Championship and the Veracruz State Trios Championship, before winning the Distrito Federal Trios Championship from Los Tarascos in 1991. La Saetas later lost the Mexico City Trios title to Los Metálicos (Oro, Plata and Bronce). When Consejo Mundial de Lucha Libre (CMLL; the new name for EMLL) started its Mini-Estrella division in 1991 Águila Solitario was given a mascota called Aguilita Soltaria, a Mini-Estrella who later became better known as "Super Muñequito". When Antonio Peña and a number of wrestlers left CMLL in 1992 for Peña's newly created Asistencia Asesoría y Administración (AAA) Águilta Solitaria remained loyal with CMLL, working for them on a regular basis until 1997 where he retired. Sometime in the early 2000s Águilita Solitaria returned to wrestling, working mainly on the independent circuit to this day.

Championships and accomplishments 
 Empresa Mexicana de Lucha Libre
 Mexican National Welterweight Championship (1 time)
 NWA World Welterweight Championship (1 time)
 State championships
 Distrito Federal Trios Championship (1 time) – with El Pantera and Ciclón Ramírez
 Mexico State Welterweight Championship (1 time)
 Nuevo León State Trios Championship (1 time) – with El Pantera and Ciclón Ramírez
 Veracruz State Trios Championship (1 time) – with El Pantera and Ciclón Ramírez

Luchas de Apuestas record

References 

1954 births
20th-century professional wrestlers
21st-century professional wrestlers
Living people
Mexican male professional wrestlers
Unidentified wrestlers
Mexican National Welterweight Champions
NWA World Welterweight Champions